The 2009–10 Asia League Ice Hockey season was the seventh season of Asia League Ice Hockey. Seven teams participated in the league, and Anyang Halla won the championship.

Regular season

Playoffs

External links
 Asia League Ice Hockey

Asia League Ice Hockey
Asia League Ice Hockey seasons
Asia